The 1902–03 season was the fourth season for FC Barcelona.

Events
Barcelona decides to withdraw from the Copa Macaya after losing two points for fielding an ineligible player in the tournament's first match. The club breaks relations with the Gymnastics Federation and decides to organize a tournament of their own: La Copa Barcelona.

Paul Haas replaced Bartomeu Terradas as president on 5 September 1902.

Squad

Matches

 1. Barcelona pulled the competition.
 2. Name of the English ship at the port of Barcelona.

References

FC Barcelona seasons
Barcelona